Kholka is a rural locality (a village) in Gorodetskoye Rural Settlement, Kichmengsko-Gorodetsky District, Vologda Oblast, Russia. The population was 20 as of 2002.

Geography 
Kholka is located 21 km northwest of Kichmengsky Gorodok (the district's administrative centre) by road. Bersenevo is the nearest rural locality.

References 

Rural localities in Kichmengsko-Gorodetsky District